Lisewo Malborskie  is a village in the administrative district of Gmina Lichnowy, within Malbork County, Pomeranian Voivodeship, in northern Poland.

The village has a population of 1,210.

Notable residents

 Jakob Sigismund Beck (1761–1840), German philosopher

References

Lisewo Malborskie